SS Albania was a cargo liner laid down in 1914 by Scotts Shipbuilding and Engineering Company Ltd. Greenock, Scotland for the Cunard Line. Owing to the First World War, she wasn't completed until 1920. Designed to maximize cargo capacity, passenger accommodations were limited to the shelter and "tween" decks. Originally intended for the Liverpool New York run, she was transferred in April of 1922 to the Canadian route. Ultimately the vessel proved a disappointment for Cunard, being too small to operate effectively as a passenger liner and too big for a freighter, and was laid up in 1925 until purchased in 1930 by the Italian company Liberia Triestina who renamed her SS California. She was converted for use as a hospital ship in 1935.

Loss
On 11 August 1941, California was torpedoed and sunk off Syracuse by a Fairey Swordfish aircraft of 830 Squadron, Fleet Air Arm, operating out of Malta.

References

1920 ships
Ships built on the River Clyde
Cargo liners
Steamships of the United Kingdom
Ships of the Cunard Line
Steamships of Italy
Merchant ships of Italy
Hospital ships in World War II
Hospital ships of Italy
Maritime incidents in August 1941
Ships sunk by British aircraft
World War II shipwrecks in the Mediterranean Sea